János Wenk (24 April 1894 -  17 October 1962) was a Hungarian water polo player and backstroke swimmer who competed in the 1912 Summer Olympics and in the 1924 Summer Olympics.

Born in Csaca, He was part of the Hungarian water polo team, which competed in the 1912 tournament as well as twelve years later in the 1924 tournament. At the 1928 tournament he was a reserve player and did not compete in a match.

In 1912 he also competed in the 100 metre backstroke event, but he was eliminated in the first round. He died in Budapest.

See also
 Hungary men's Olympic water polo team records and statistics
 List of men's Olympic water polo tournament goalkeepers

References

External links 
 profile 

Hungarian male swimmers
Olympic swimmers of Hungary
Hungarian male water polo players
Water polo goalkeepers
Olympic water polo players of Hungary
Male backstroke swimmers
Swimmers at the 1912 Summer Olympics
Water polo players at the 1912 Summer Olympics
Water polo players at the 1924 Summer Olympics
People from Čadca
Sportspeople from the Žilina Region
1894 births
1962 deaths
Water polo players from Budapest